The 1924 Italian Grand Prix was a Grand Prix motor race held at Monza on 19 October 1924.

Classification 

Notes
  – Nino Cirio raced under the name "Nino".

References

Italian Grand Prix
Italian Grand Prix
Grand Prix